The twelfth season of Mad TV, an American sketch comedy series, originally aired in the United States on the Fox Network between September 16, 2006, and May 19, 2007.

Summary
For the first time since season four, MADtv saw not just a change in cast members, but also a change in format.

On the cast member front, Stephanie Weir (who actually left at the end of season ten, but was in a lot of pretaped season eleven sketches), Danielle Gaither, and Frank Caliendo were gone (with Gaither being fired by FOX while Weir and Caliendo left on their own accord). In their places, Frank Caeti and Nicole Randall Johnson were promoted to repertory status while Lisa Donovan was hired, starting with the fourteenth episode of the season, then fired by season's end.

On the show's format front, the cold opening sketch was replaced by show announcer, Brian Fairlee, giving a preview of the sketches and guest stars that would appear in the episode. The sketches themselves became shorter, often shown in several parts so as to preserve the humor. A lot of political sketches centered on George W. Bush and his administration were nearly non-existent (barring the showing of a claymation short where Bush [voiced by Crista Flanagan] threatens to blackmail Santa Claus if Santa does not help him defeat his enemies). However, sketches with political undertones (such as "Steve Jobs' The iRack") and sketches that focused on the then-recent 2008 election, featuring Nicole Parker as Hillary Clinton and Keegan Michael-Key as Barack Obama would make up for the lack of Bush-related political satire. More focus was put on TV show and movie parodies, celebrity-based sketches, music video parodies, one-shot situational comedy sketches, and recurring character sketches. Animated sketches (mostly claymation, Monty Python-style cutout animation, and crude 2D Flash animation) also made a comeback after being phased out since season five (though seasons six, seven, eight, and nine had some semi-recurring and one-shot animated pieces, such as Shaq and the Super Lakers, Public Schoolhouse Rock, How Winona Ryder Stole Christmas, Chocolate Covered Peanuts, and Morbidly Obese Albert) with the appearance of the recurring sketch, "Celebrity Pets", a glut of non-sequitur shorts, "Weekly News with Toby" (featuring Frank Caeti giving a first grader's point of view of current events) and a three-part sketch called, Cartoon Network's Rejected Superheroes.

Notable guest stars this season include: Dwayne "The Rock" Johnson, Eva Longoria, Seth MacFarlane (who, back when MADtv was starting out, was offered the chance to produce animated shorts for the show), the Los Angeles Kings, Tom Bergeron, Efren Ramirez, and Fred Willard.

Opening montage 
The 12th season had a new title sequence with shots of the performers as they prepared for the show. The screen divides into three different live-action shots. When the theme music starts, the announcer introduces each cast member alphabetically. After the last cast member is introduced, the whole cast is shown in a live-action shot. The music stops and the title sequence ends with the phrase "You are now watching Mad TV". The sequence also has a new announcer, Brian Fairlee.

Cast

Repertory cast members
 Ike Barinholtz  (22/22 episodes) 
 Frank Caeti  (19/22 episodes) 
 Crista Flanagan  (22/22 episodes) 
 Nicole Randall Johnson  (22/22 episodes) 
 Keegan-Michael Key  (22/22 episodes) 
 Bobby Lee  (22/22 episodes) 
 Michael McDonald  (22/22 episodes) 
 Arden Myrin  (22/22 episodes) 
 Nicole Parker  (22/22 episodes) 
 Jordan Peele  (22/22 episodes) 

Featured cast members
 Lisa Donovan  (4/22 episodes)

Episodes

Home Release
Season 12 used to be available on HBO Max, with only episode 4 missing.

References

External links 

 

12
2006 American television seasons
2007 American television seasons